Lophocereus schottii, the senita cactus, is a species of cactus from southern Arizona and north-western Mexico, particularly Baja California and Sonora. Synonyms include Pilocereus schottii and Pachycereus schottii.

The senita cactus exhibits mutualism with the senita moth. The senita moth is the only nocturnal pollinator of the cactus, and the moth relies on the cactus as a host for reproduction.

References

Echinocereeae
Cacti of the United States
Cacti of Mexico
Plants described in 1856